The 2002–03 Notre Dame Fighting Irish Men's Basketball Team represented the University of Notre Dame in the 2002–03 NCAA Division I men's basketball season. Led by head coach Mike Brey, the Irish finished with a record of 24–10 and battled their way to the Sweet Sixteen of the 2003 NCAA Division I men's basketball tournament.

Schedule

Roster

References

Notre Dame Fighting Irish men's basketball seasons
Notre Dame
Notre Dame Fighting Irish men's basketball team
Notre Dame Fighting Irish men's basketball team
Notre Dame